Costache Antoniu (1900–1979) was a Romanian stage and film actor.

He graduated in 1926 from the Conservatory of Dramatic Art in Iași. After playing at a theater in Sibiu, he went to the Popular Theater in Bucharest, then at the National Theater in Craiova. He acquired his reputation at the National Theatre Bucharest, where he carried out a rich activity.

Between 1955 and 1970 Antoniu was rector of the Institute of Theater and Cinematography in Bucharest.

Filmography

References

External links 
 

1900 births
1979 deaths
People from Iași County
Romanian male film actors
Romanian male stage actors
Rectors of universities in Romania